The following Union Army units and commanders fought in the Second Battle of Bull Run, also known as the Second Battle of Manassas, of the American Civil War. The Confederate order of battle is listed separately. Order of battle compiled from the army organization during the battle, the casualty returns and the reports.

Abbreviations used

Military rank
 MG = Major General
 BG = Brigadier General
 Col = Colonel
 Ltc = Lieutenant Colonel
 Maj = Major
 Cpt = Captain
 Lt = Lieutenant

Other
 w = wounded
 mw = mortally wounded
 k = killed
 c = captured

Union forces

Army of Virginia

MG John Pope

Chief of Staff: Col George D. Ruggles
Chief of Artillery: Cpt Alexander Piper
Chief of Cavalry: BG Washington L. Elliott (w)

Headquarters Escort:
 1st Ohio Cavalry, Companies A and C

I Corps

MG Franz Sigel (w)

Chief of Artillery: Cpt Ulric Dahlgren

Headquarters Escort:
 1st Indiana Cavalry, Companies I and K

II Corps

III Corps

MG Irvin McDowell

Chief of Staff: Col Edmund Schriver
Chief of Artillery: Maj Davis Tillson

Headquarters Troops:
 Maine Light Artillery, 3rd Battery (Pontonniers): Cpt James G. Swett
 13th Pennsylvania Reserves (1st Rifles), Companies C, G, H and I: Ltc Thomas L. Kane

Reserve Corps
BG Samuel D. Sturgis

Army of the Potomac

The following Corps from the Army of the Potomac were attached to the Army of Virginia.

III Corps

MG Samuel P. Heintzelman

V Corps

MG Fitz John Porter

Chief of Staff: Ltc Frederick T. Locke

IX Corps

MG Jesse L. Reno

Notes

References
 Robert Underwood Johnson, Clarence Clough Buell, Battles and Leaders of the Civil War, Volume 2 (Pdf), New York: The Century Co., 1887.
 Hennessy, John J., Return to Bull Run: The Campaign and Battle of Second Manassas. University of Oklahoma Press, Norman, 1993. 
 Manassas National Battlefield Park - Battle of Second Manassas
 The Armies at the Second Battle of Bull Run
 U.S. War Department, The War of the Rebellion: a Compilation of the Official Records of the Union and Confederate Armies, U.S. Government Printing Office, 1880–1901.

American Civil War orders of battle